Section 92A of the Constitution Act, 1867 is a provision of the Constitution of Canada relating to provincial jurisdiction over natural resources.  It was added to the Constitution Act, 1867 in 1982, as part of the Patriation of the Constitution.

The Constitution Act, 1867 is the constitutional statute which established Canada.  Originally named the British North America Act, 1867, the Act continues to be the foundational statute for the Constitution of Canada, although it has been amended many times since 1867.  It is now recognised as part of the supreme law of Canada.

Constitution Act, 1867

The Constitution Act, 1867 is part of the Constitution of Canada and thus part of the supreme law of Canada.  It was the product of extensive negotiations by the governments of the British North American provinces in the 1860s. The Act sets out the constitutional framework of Canada, including the structure of the federal government and the powers of the federal government and the provinces.  Originally enacted in 1867 by the British Parliament under the name the British North America Act, 1867, in 1982 the Act was brought under full Canadian control through the Patriation of the Constitution, and was re-named the Constitution Act, 1867.  Since Patriation, the Act can only be amended in Canada, under the amending formula set out in the Constitution Act, 1982.

Text of section 92A 

Section 92A reads:

Section 92A is found in Part VI of the Constitution Act, 1867, dealing with the distribution of legislative powers.  It was added to the Constitution Act, 1867 in 1982, by the Constitution Act, 1982, and has not been amended since its enactment.

Purpose and interpretation
Section 92A was added to the Constitution Act, 1867 at the insistence of the provinces of Saskatchewan and Alberta, as part of the Patriation agreement in 1982.  The provision was in response to two decisions of the Supreme Court of Canada in the 1970s, which limited the ability of the provinces to regulate the use of their natural resources.  Section 92A was enacted by the Constitution Act, 1982 as an amendment to the Constitution Act, 1867.

Sixth Schedule:  Text
The term "primary production" used in s. 92A is defined by the Sixth Schedule to the Constitution Act, 1867.  It reads as follows:

Like section 92A, the Sixth Schedule was added as an amendment in 1982.

References 

Constitution of Canada
Canadian Confederation
Federalism in Canada
1982 in Canadian law
Constitutional amendments